Business Intelligence Markup Language (BIML) is a domain-specific XML dialect for defining business intelligence (BI) assets.  Biml authored BI assets can currently be used by the BIDS Helper add-on for Microsoft SQL Server Business Intelligence Development Studio (BIDS) and the Varigence Mist (now called BimlStudio) integrated development environment; both tools translate Biml metadata into SQL Server Integration Services (SSIS) and SQL Server Analysis Services (SSAS) assets for the Microsoft SQL Server platform. However, emitters can be created to compile Biml for any desired BI platform.

While Biml’s declarative design is sufficient to author BI assets, BimlScript extends the language by enabling authors to embed C# or VB.NET code within Biml, similar to how ASP.NET includes .NET code within static HTML markup.  BimlScript is used to merge changes into existing Biml assets, automatically generate Biml code, and apply changes across multiple Biml files during compilation.

History

Biml

Biml is an XML dialect that specifies all aspects of a BI solution, including relational models, data transformation packages, multi-dimensional models, and tabular models.

Unlike other BI solutions, Biml has a "write once, target any platform" philosophy. This enables Biml users to switch their target platform without needing to change their code. Currently, Biml targets SQL Server versions 2005, 2008, 2008 R2, 2012 and 2014, emitting SSIS packages and SSAS cubes.

Because Biml is XML, it can leverage the vast ecosystem of tools for XML based languages. This also makes it human-readable/writable, so it is easier to edit by hand than the SSIS/SSAS files it generates.

In late 2009, Biml was extended with BimlScript. BimlScript allows C# or VB.NET code nuggets to be embedded directly within Biml. BimlScript's goal is to automate repetitive work in reusable scripts. Additionally, it has been used to automate package generation and build reusable patterns for BI tasks. BimlScript is also used to take metadata from various sources (relational database structure, relational data, flat files, annotations, etc...) and automatically generate Biml code from it.

Mist
Mist is an IDE for authoring Biml code and building BI assets. Mist leverages visual design capabilities and debugging features to simultaneously edit entire business intelligence models, including relational tables, SSIS packages, and cubes.   Mist also incorporates modern programming IDE features, including text editors with syntax highlighting, Intelliprompt and quick-info displays, source control integration, and multi-monitor support.

BIDS Helper
As Biml’s popularity has grown, key portions of the Biml engine, including dynamic package generation, have been contributed to the BIDS Helper open source project hosted on CodePlex.

BimlScript community
BimlScript.com is a community website for developing and sharing Biml solutions to BI problems, and contributing Biml content to share with others. Along with tutorials, walkthroughs, and videos, the site provides an online Biml editor.

Code generation
Biml files are compiled to produce BI assets for a chosen platform. Currently, it is possible to generate assets for Microsoft’s SSIS, SSAS, and SQL Server platforms, for the 2005, 2008 (R2), 2012 and 2014 releases. Other platforms may be targeted in the future.

Syntax

Biml has a syntax that’s common to all XML languages. Tags begin and end with < and >, respectively. Furthermore, tags can have attributes and nested elements.

Biml

Declaration
Biml documents begin with a common declaration
<Biml xmlns="http://schemas.varigence.com/biml.xsd">

Root types
Biml has a well-defined set of root types, indicating the various kinds of BI assets that can be created:

 Connections
 Databases
 Schemas
 Tables
 Dimensions
 Facts
 Packages
 File Formats
 Script Projects
 Cubes
 Principals

Example
This is an example of the AdventureWorks DimCurrency table, authored in Biml:

<Biml xmlns="http://schemas.varigence.com/biml.xsd">
  <Dimensions>
    <Dimension Name="DimCurrency" SchemaName="Target.dbo" AttributeAllMemberName="All Source Currencies" DimensionType="Currency" FriendlyName="Currency">
      <Columns>
        <Column Name="CurrencyKey" />
        <Column Name="CurrencyAlternateKey" DataType="StringFixedLength" Length="3" />
        <Column Name="CurrencyName" DataType="String" Length="50" />
      </Columns>
      <Keys>
        <Identity Name="IK_DimCurrency">
          <Columns>
            <Column ColumnName="CurrencyKey" />
          </Columns>
        </Identity>
        <UniqueKey Name="AK_DimCurrency_CurrencyAlternateKey">
          <Columns>
            <Column ColumnName="CurrencyAlternateKey" />
          </Columns>
        </UniqueKey>
      </Keys>
      <Indexes></Indexes>
      <Attributes>
        <Attribute Name="Source Currency" EstimatedCount="101" OrderBy="Name" AttributeType="CurrencySource" GroupingBehavior="DiscourageGrouping">
          <InstanceSelection>DropDown</InstanceSelection>
          <KeyColumns>
            <KeyColumn ColumnName="CurrencyName" NullProcessing="Error" />
          </KeyColumns>
        </Attribute>
        <Attribute Name="Source Currency Code" EstimatedCount="105" OrderBy="Name" AttributeType="CurrencyIsoCode" Usage="Key" GroupingBehavior="DiscourageGrouping">
          <InstanceSelection>DropDown</InstanceSelection>
          <KeyColumns>
            <KeyColumn ColumnName="CurrencyKey" NullProcessing="Error" />
          </KeyColumns>
          <NameColumn ColumnName="CurrencyAlternateKey" />
        </Attribute>
      </Attributes>
      <Relationships>
        <Relationship Name="Source Currency" ParentAttributeName="Source Currency Code" ChildAttributeName="Source Currency" Type="Rigid" />
      </Relationships>
    </Dimension>
  </Dimensions>
</Biml>

BimlScript
All BimlScript tags begin and end with <# and #> delimiters, respectively. Special types of BimlScript tags use augmented versions of these delimiters, to indicate specific usages.

Directives
A Biml file, with BimlScript, begins with at least one directive. Directives provide instructions to the Biml engine, regarding how to process the BimlScript and generate its Biml. Directives are single tags that begin with <#@. Each directive begins with a single term, followed by attributes that supply required values.

The two most common directives are template and import.

Template
This directive indicates that the file's BimlScript uses the C# programming language.
<#@ template language="C#" #>

Import
This directive specifies .NET namespaces that should be imported for the file. It is functionally equivalent to the C# using statement or VB.NET Imports statement.
<#@ import namespace="Varigence.Languages.Biml.Connection" #>

Delimiters
When authoring BimlScript, additional delimiters may be used. These delimiters match the behavior of T4 template delimiters.

Example
This BimlScript example imports a database's assets via a connection, declared in a separate file, named "AdventureWorksLT". Each schema and table from the imported database is then embedded directly within the Schemas and Tables collections, respectively.
 
<#@ template language="C#" hostspecific="True" tier="2" #>
<#@ import namespace="Varigence.Languages.Biml.Connection" #>
<#@ import namespace="Varigence.Hadron.Extensions" #>
<#@ import namespace="Varigence.Hadron.Extensions.SchemaManagement" #>
<#@ import namespace="Varigence.Hadron.CoreLowerer.SchemaManagement" #>

<#+ public ImportResults Results
{ 
    get 
    { 
        return ((AstOleDbConnectionNode)RootNode.Connections["AdventureWorksLT"]).ImportDB();
    }
}
#> 

<Biml xmlns="http://schemas.varigence.com/biml.xsd">
    <Databases>
        <Database Name="MyDatabase" ConnectionName="AdventureWorksLT" />
    </Databases>
    <Schemas>
        <#=Results.SchemaNodes.GetBiml()#>
    </Schemas>
    <Tables> 
        <#=Results.TableNodes.GetBiml()#>
    </Tables>
</Biml>

This example shows how developers can use Biml and BimlScript to:
 Import schemas and tables directly from a database, and use them without needing to manually copy their structure.
 Have any changes to the assets be automatically reflected the next time this code is run.
 Import the assets and convert them to Biml using only two simple lines of code.

References

External links
 bimlscript.com - Biml online community
 BIDS Helper - Microsoft SQL Server extension with Biml capabilities
 Biml Language Reference - by the Varigence Corporation
 Microsoft SQL Server - Further information on the Microsoft SQL Server platform.
 Mist Walkthrough - Biml examples using the Mist IDE

XML markup languages
Business intelligence